Bob Hayden is the former Referee In Chief of USA Hockey.  He served as the head of the National Ice Hockey Officials Association prior to that.  He provided an annual comparison of ice hockey rules in the NCAA, National Federation, and USA Hockey.  His positions on ice hockey rules were regularly available on USA Hockey's "Ask an Official Page" .  He is generally regarded as being against "old time hockey", that is, he is in favor of more restrictive rules that protect players and help to eliminate fighting, checking from behind, any hits to the head, and zero tolerance to verbal abuse of officials.

Year of birth missing (living people)
Living people
American ice hockey officials